Amala Ratna Zandile Dlamini (born October 21, 1995), known professionally as Doja Cat, is an American rapper, singer-songwriter, and record producer. Born and raised in Los Angeles, California, she began making and releasing music on SoundCloud. Her song "So High" caught the attention of Kemosabe and RCA Records, with which she signed a joint record deal. She released her debut EP Purrr! in 2014.

After a hiatus from releasing music and the uneventful rollout of her debut studio album, Amala (2018), Doja Cat earned viral success as an internet meme with her 2018 single "Mooo!", a novelty song in which she makes satirical claims about being a cow. Capitalizing on her growing popularity, she released her second studio album, Hot Pink, in the following year. It reached the top 10 of the US Billboard 200 and spawned the single "Say So", which topped the Billboard Hot 100 chart following the release of a remix featuring Nicki Minaj. This album was followed by Planet Her (2021), which spent three consecutive weeks at number two on the Billboard 200 and spawned the top 10 singles "Kiss Me More" (featuring SZA), "Need to Know", and "Woman".

Described by The Wall Street Journal as "a skilled technical rapper with a strong melodic sense and a bold visual presence", Doja Cat is known for creating music videos and songs that achieve popularity on social media websites such as TikTok. She is also well-versed in internet culture herself, and is famed for her absurdly humorous personality and online presence. Doja Cat has received numerous accolades throughout her career, including one Grammy Award from sixteen nominations, five Billboard Music Awards, five American Music Awards, and three MTV Video Music Awards.

Early life 
Amala Ratna Zandile Dlamini was born on October 21, 1995, in the Tarzana neighborhood of Los Angeles, California, into an artistic family. Her mother, Deborah Sawyer, is an American graphic designer of Ashkenazi Jewish heritage, and her father, Dumisani Dlamini, is a South African performer of Zulu descent and has since acquired a US temporal citizenship in 2007, best known for starring as Crocodile in the original Broadway cast of the musical Sarafina! and the 1992 film adaptation. The two had a brief relationship after meeting in New York City where Dumisani performed on Broadway, but he was too busy on tour to spend time with Amala and her brother. He claims to have left his family in the US for South Africa out of homesickness, in the hopes that they would join him there, yet Dlamini has on multiple occasions suggested that she is estranged from her father, claiming that she "never met him". Her father has denied these claims, claiming that he has a "healthy" relationship with his daughter and that her management team had tried to block all his attempts to contact her out of the fear that they might lose her.

Soon after her birth, Dlamini moved from Tarzana to Rye, New York, where she lived for five years with her maternal grandmother, a Jewish architect and painter. At the age of eight, Dlamini moved with her mother and brother and returned to California to live at the Sai Anantam Ashram, a commune in Agoura Hills, and practiced Hinduism for four years. The swami and founder of the commune was American jazz musician Alice Coltrane (known by the Sanskrit name Turiyasangitananda). While living at the commune, Dlamini started wearing head-covering scarves and singing bhajans at temple, yet felt like she could not properly "be a kid" at the ashram. Her family then moved to Oak Park, where she started attending dance lessons and experienced a "sporty childhood", often skateboarding and visiting Malibu for surf camps. Dlamini and her brother also experienced harsh racism as they were some of the only mixed-race children in the area. She claims to have lacked interest in school from then on, instead taking a liking for dance. While at the ashram she had been dancing the style of Indian classical dance called Bharatanatyam. As she grew older and moved away from the ashram, she moved on to breakdancing classes and joined a professional poplocking troupe with whom she competed in dance battles throughout Los Angeles while still attending high school. Her aunt, a vocal coach, had given Dlamini singing lessons to help her audition for Central Los Angeles Area New High School #9, a performing arts high school in Los Angeles. She frequently skipped school to participate in online chatrooms. After becoming discouraged about her education and career path, Dlamini claims that she realized in eleventh grade that "performing and music was all [she] ever cared about." She eventually dropped out at age 16 while in her junior year. She also attributes this act to her struggles with attention deficit hyperactivity disorder (ADHD), saying that "it felt like I was stuck in one spot and everybody else was progressing constantly".

Career

2012–2017: Career beginnings and record deal 
Doja Cat has described life after dropping out of school as "messy", claiming that she slept on the floor and spent "all night and day" browsing the internet, looking for beats and instrumentals from YouTube which she downloaded and used to create her own music. After becoming fascinated with internet culture and websites like EBaum's World and Myspace, she taught herself to sing, rap and use GarageBand while at home without a job, frequently making music and uploading it to SoundCloud. In late 2012, "So High" became the first permanent upload on her SoundCloud account. Doja Cat began her career in the Los Angeles underground hip-hop scene, performing at parties and cyphers, and connecting with rappers such as Busdriver, Ill Camille and VerBS, the latter of whom claims to have helped hone her craft and find her first gig. It was during this time that she met producer Jerry "Tizhimself" Powell, who had stumbled upon her SoundCloud account. He introduced her to record producer Yeti Beats, who invited her to record at his studio in the neighbourhood of Echo Park, which also served as "an oasis of sorts for Doja to escape from the turmoil at home". Yeti Beats then connected her with Kemosabe Records, an imprint of RCA Records, where she signed under label executive Dr. Luke and his publishing company Prescription Songs at the age of 17. This deal also came with a temporary artist management partnership with Roc Nation.

In August 2014, Doja Cat released her debut EP, Purrr!, described as "spacey, eastern-influenced R&B" by The Fader. "So High" was repackaged and released as her solo commercial debut single prior to the EP's release, and was later featured on the Fox series Empire in the third episode of the show's first season. In mid-2015, Doja Cat temporarily signed to OG Maco's label, OGG. Following the signing, in late 2016, Maco and Doja Cat collaborated on the song "Monster", from Maco's 2017 mixtape, Children of The Rage. She had started  experiencing writer's block, which led her to decline American singer Billie Eilish's offer to feature on what would later become her popular 2017 single "Bellyache". Doja Cat would stop releasing music for a while amid what she describes as a "creative limbo", which was influenced by her record labels not paying her much attention, as well as the effects of "finding herself" and smoking too much marijuana.

2018–2019: Amala and "Mooo!" 
Her first major commercial release in four years, Doja Cat released the song "Roll with Us" in February 2018 following a brief hiatus. The following month, she released "Go to Town" as the lead single from her debut album, with an accompanying music video. "Candy" was released as the album's second single that same month. The track would later become a sleeper hit after a "dance challenge" on the video-sharing platform TikTok went viral in late 2019. The single consequently charted in countries such as Australia, Canada and the United States, with the latter having the song peak at 86 on the Billboard Hot 100, making this her first solo entry on the chart. On March 30, 2018, Doja Cat's debut studio album Amala was released through RCA and Kemosabe Records, and included the three singles. Its release was largely uneventful, as it was ignored by critics and failed to chart in any market. Doja Cat has since expressed strong disdain toward the record, claiming that it doesn't entirely represent her as an artist and that it isn't a "finished album" since she was constantly partying or high on marijuana during its recording. She claims it was also rushed in order to meet deadlines from the record labels who paid it "almost no support".

In August 2018, Doja Cat self-published the homemade music video for "Mooo!", a novelty song with absurdist lyrics in which she fantasizes about being a cow. The video promptly garnered viral success as an internet meme, attaining over three million views in one week. Due to popular demand following this viral success, the single version of "Mooo!" was released onto digital platforms later that month as the lead single from the deluxe edition of Amala. This was followed by the release of the second single, "Tia Tamera" featuring Rico Nasty, and its accompanying music video in February 2019. The full deluxe edition of Amala was released on March 1, 2019, and featured the bonus tracks "Mooo!", "Tia Tamera" and "Juicy". The success of "Mooo!" is believed to have "irrefutably proved" to her record labels that Doja Cat was a marketable artist, which led them to start paying more attention to her.

2019–2020: Breakthrough with Hot Pink 

A remix version of Doja Cat's song "Juicy", from the deluxe version of Amala, added a verse from American rapper Tyga and was released alongside a music video in August 2019 as the lead single from her second studio album. Following the release of the remix, the song debuted at number 83 on the Billboard Hot 100, marking Doja Cat's first entry on the chart, and ultimately peaked at number 41. The Recording Industry Association of America (RIAA) would later award the song a platinum certification in the United States. The song's success led to Amala debuting for the first time on the Billboard 200 chart that same month. In October 2019, Doja Cat released "Bottom Bitch", the second single from her second album. This was followed by the release of the single "Rules" alongside the announcement of her second studio album Hot Pink. Hot Pink was released on November 7, 2019, to generally favorable reviews. The album would eventually peak at number 9 on the Billboard 200. Doja Cat was meant to feature on a track titled "Broward Coward" from an early version of American rapper XXXTentacion's fourth studio album, Bad Vibes Forever, however the song was ultimately scrapped when the album tracklist was completely revised for its posthumous release in December 2019. She later released the single "Boss Bitch" as part of the soundtrack for the 2020 film Birds of Prey.

In January 2020, "Say So" was sent to radio to become the fourth single off of her album Hot Pink. The song was originally released alongside the album in November 2019, but gained wider popularity through the video-sharing platform TikTok. She performed the song on The Tonight Show Starring Jimmy Fallon in February 2020. The next day, she released the music video for the song, directed by Hannah Lux Davis. The solo version of "Say So" peaked at number five on the Hot 100, becoming her first top-ten single, and was the most streamed song of 2020 by a female artist in the United States. In May 2020, following the release of a remix of "Say So" featuring Nicki Minaj, the single topped the Billboard Hot 100, becoming the first number-one single for both artists, and the first ever female rap collaboration to peak atop the chart.

In March 2020, Doja Cat was set to embark on the Hot Pink Tour in support of the album, before it was postponed due to the COVID-19 pandemic. She was featured on a remix of the Weeknd's single "In Your Eyes" in May 2020, as well as on the single "Shimmy" by rapper Lil Wayne from the deluxe version of his 2020 album Funeral. In June, she was featured on the single "Pussy Talk" by the rap duo City Girls. She released the music video for her single "Like That". She also uploaded the demo song "Unisex Freestyle" to SoundCloud in late June 2020. At the 20th BET Awards, Doja Cat was nominated for two awards, Best Female Hip Hop Artist and Video of the Year. In August 2020, her song "Freak", which had been on SoundCloud since 2018, was officially released on digital platforms.

Doja Cat won the award for Push Best New Artist at the 2020 MTV Video Music Awards, where she also performed a medley of the songs "Say So" and "Like That". She was credited as a lead artist on the remix for Chloe x Halle's song "Do It", which also featured City Girls and Mulatto, the following month. She was featured alongside Australian singer Sia on the track "Del Mar" from Puerto Rican singer Ozuna's 2020 album Enoc, also released in September. The "Juicy" remix featuring Tyga was nominated for Top R&B Song at the 2020 Billboard Music Awards. In October 2020, Doja Cat was featured on American singer Bebe Rexha's single "Baby, I'm Jealous", the lead single from Rexha's second studio album, Better Mistakes. She performed a burlesque-themed medley of "Juicy", "Say So" and "Like That" at the 2020 Billboard Music Awards, inspired by Chicago and Moulin Rouge. That same month, Doja Cat performed both "Baby, I'm Jealous" with Rexha and "Del Mar" with Ozuna on The Tonight Show Starring Jimmy Fallon and Jimmy Kimmel Live!, respectively. Doja Cat was featured on the album track "Motive" from Ariana Grande's 2020 album Positions, which peaked at number 32 on the Billboard Hot 100, becoming both her highest debut and second-ever top 40 entry.

Doja Cat performed a metal rendition of "Say So" at the 2020 MTV Europe Music Awards ceremony, where she also won the award for Best New Act. She won the award for The New Artist of 2020 at the 46th People's Choice Awards. She additionally won both New Artist of the Year and Favourite Soul/R&B Female Artist at the 2020 American Music Awards ceremony, where she performed "Baby, I'm Jealous" with Bebe Rexha. On December 24, 2020, Doja Cat released a series of videos on her YouTube channel named "Hot Pink Sessions" where she performed three songs twice with two different "looks". On December 31, 2020, Doja Cat performed "Say So", "Like That", and "Juicy" at the annual Dick Clark's New Year's Rockin' Eve show.

According to sales in the United States, Billboard ranked Doja Cat at number five on both the Top New Artists of 2020 and Top Female Artists of 2020 charts. After her on-demand audio streams in the U.S. increased by 300% from 2019, Rolling Stone ranked her at number one on their list of the ten biggest breakthrough artists of 2020. Forbes named Doja Cat "one of the top breakout stars of 2020" while including her on their annual 30 Under 30 list. Doja Cat was the fourth most-Googled musician of 2020 in the United States.

2021–present: Planet Her 

On January 7, 2021, Doja Cat was featured on the single "Best Friend" by rapper Saweetie, and appeared in the accompanying music video. The following week, Doja Cat appeared alongside Megan Thee Stallion on the remix of "34+35" by Ariana Grande. Following the release of the remix, the song reached a new peak of number two on the Billboard Hot 100. In early 2021, Doja's song "Streets" became a sleeper hit after live performances of the song went viral on TikTok. TikTok also spawned a viral challenge which uses a mashup of "Streets" and "Put Your Head on My Shoulder" by Paul Anka. This caused the song to enter the Billboard Hot 100, where it peaked at number 16. Doja Cat was nominated for three awards at the 63rd Annual Grammy Awards, namely Best New Artist, and her single "Say So" being nominated for Record of the Year and Best Pop Solo Performance. In 2021, she was placed on "Times 100 Next" list, which highlights 100 emerging figures, with her write-up being penned by American rapper Lil Nas X.

Doja Cat revealed the title of her third studio album, Planet Her, in a March 2021 interview with V. On April 10, the song "Kiss Me More" featuring SZA was released alongside a music video as the lead single for the album. It received critical acclaim, and commercial success, spending nineteen consecutive weeks within the top 10 of the Billboard Hot 100, breaking the record for the most weeks in the top 10 by a female collaboration. The song peaked at number three and became Doja Cat's third top 10 hit. Later that month, Doja Cat performed the songs "Best Friend" with Saweetie, "Rules", "Streets" and a solo version of "Kiss Me More" at Triller's inaugural Fight Club event. On April 23, 2021, Doja Cat launched an NFT marketplace titled "Juicy Drops". In May 2021, Doja Cat won the award for Top Female R&B Artist at the 2021 Billboard Music Awards, where she performed "Kiss Me More" with SZA. Later that month, she performed a solo version of the same song in a medley with "Streets" and "Say So" at the 2021 iHeartRadio Music Awards, where she won the award for Best New Pop Artist.

The song "Need to Know" was released alongside a music video as the first promotional single from Planet Her on June 11, 2021. Doja Cat wrote that it was released in anticipation of the "more important" second single, which was confirmed to be "You Right" with the Weeknd. Doja Cat officially announced the release of Planet Her and revealed its tracklist and album art via social media a few hours before the release of "Need to Know". The album was released to generally positive reviews, and opened at number two on the Billboard 200 where it remained for another two weeks, becoming the first album to spend its first three weeks at number two on the chart since The Pinkprint (2014) by Nicki Minaj in January 2015. Elsewhere, it topped the charts in New Zealand, and landed in the top 5 in countries such as the United Kingdom, Australia, Norway and Ireland.

Doja Cat guest starred as the temporary romantic interest of American rapper and comedian Lil Dicky in the second season of the TV series Dave, which premiered on June 16, 2021. On September 10, she was announced as a Pepsi ambassador and starred in an advertisement in which she performs a modern reenactment of the song "You're the One That I Want" from the musical film Grease, as part of a campaign celebrating the launch of the Pepsi-Cola Soda Shop. Her first-ever gig as a television presenter, Doja Cat hosted the 2021 MTV Video Music Awards ceremony, where she also performed the songs "Been Like This" and "You Right". She won the awards for Best Collaboration (shared with SZA for "Kiss Me More") and Best Art Direction (shared with Saweetie for "Best Friend"), among nominations for Artist of the Year, Video of the Year and Best Visual Effects. It is the first time in history where a nominee in the Video of the Year category hosted the ceremony in that same year. Doja Cat was praised for her presenting abilities, with Pitchfork noting that she "reinvent[ed] award-show hosting".

Doja Cat was featured on the song "Scoop" from Lil Nas X's debut studio album Montero (2021), which was released on September 17, and then on the song "Icy Hot" from American rapper Young Thug's second studio album Punk (2021), which was released on October 15. That same month, she reached number one on the Billboard Hot 100 Songwriters chart for the first time in her career, and also became the first rapper to place three top 10 songs on the US Mainstream Top 40, with "You Right", "Need to Know" and "Kiss Me More". She featured alongside Saweetie on French Montana's song "Handstand" from his forth studio album They Got Amnesia (2021). The music video for Planet Her's fourth single, "Woman", was released on December 3. According to Billboard, Doja Cat closed 2021 as the bestselling female R&B and hip-hop artist in the US, and the forth bestselling female artist overall, additionally placing six songs on the year-end Hot 100. Planet Her was also the sixth best-selling album in the US, and the fifth most streamed album globally on Spotify in 2021. In 2022, Doja Cat won the awards for Female Rapper of the Year and Performer of the Year at the 2022 XXL Awards. She received nominations for eight awards at the 64th Annual Grammy Awards, the most for any female artist. "Kiss Me More" won the award for Best Pop Duo Performance, while her other nominations included Album of the Year (Planet Her and Montero), Record of the Year ("Kiss Me More"), Song of the Year ("Kiss Me More"), Best Pop Vocal Album (Planet Her), Best Rap Song ("Best Friend") and Best Melodic Rap Performance ("Need to Know").

In February 2022, Doja Cat released a cover of the song "Celebrity Skin" by American rock band Hole, as part of a Taco Bell commercial in which she starred, and premiered it at the Super Bowl LVI. The cover contains reworked lyrics written by Doja Cat and Courtney Love, the frontwoman of Hole. Later that month, a collaboration with Tyga, titled "Freaky Deaky", was released as a single, alongside a music video directed by Christian Breslauer. She contributed to the soundtrack album for Baz Luhrmann's biographical film Elvis (2022) by recording "Vegas", released on May 6, 2022, as the album's lead single.

During an Instagram livestream in December 2021, Doja Cat revealed that she wanted her project after Planet Her to be a double album. In a cover story for Elle, published on May 24, 2022, she said that she planned for the album to be "predominantly rap", a callback to the musical style of her earliest works. However, prior to the Instagram livestream, Doja Cat said that she has been experiencing career burnout. She expressed her disdain for "unnecessary" obligations, while admitting that she is no longer enjoying her career. Doja Cat continued to publicise her frustrations during a South American festival tour in March 2022. After an incident involving Paraguayan fans, which followed a storm that prompted the cancellation of her scheduled show, she posted to Twitter: "Everything is dead to me, music is dead, and I'm a fucking fool for ever thinking I was made for this... This shit ain't for me so I'm out. Y'all take care."

Artistry

Influences 

Doja Cat has cited Nicki Minaj as her biggest influence. In a Billboard interview, Doja Cat stated that she is "in love with everything Nicki Minaj has put out into the world." On the song "Get Into It (Yuh)" from her third studio album, Planet Her (2021), she pays tribute to Minaj and borrows lyrics and rap delivery from her debut 2010 single "Massive Attack". Critics noted that the album as whole was largely influenced by Minaj herself with The New Yorker noting that she "build[s] upon the pop-rap legacy established by her predecessor Nicki Minaj". She has also named Lauryn Hill and Busta Rhymes as some of her biggest influences. While speaking about Busta Rhymes, she stated: "if I hear a beat Busta Rhymes would absolutely kill, I'll use my voice to do a flow similar to his."

Additionally, Doja Cat has cited Rihanna, Beyoncé, D'Angelo, Missy Elliott, and Christina Aguilera among her major influences. She draws inspiration from her background engaging in online activities and delving into sub-cultures as a suburban teenager, as well as the artists her mother exposed to her as a child such as Fugees, Erykah Badu, Jamiroquai, Earth, Wind & Fire, Black Eyed Peas, Tupac, Aaliyah, DMX, India Arie and TLC. The Hindu culture of her childhood as well as Japanese culture have also been noted as sources of inspiration for Purrr! (2014) and other aspects of her early career. In an interview with Big Boy, she stated her admiration for Janet Jackson and Prince.

Stage name and persona 
As a teenager in 2012, Doja Cat gained her stage name from one of her cats as well as her favorite strain of marijuana, stating, "I was heavily addicted to weed and weed culture, so when I began rapping I thought of the word 'doja' and how it sounds like a girl's name." She has since expressed slight disdain towards the name and the persona that it carries, stating in November 2021 that "my image was the pothead hippie girl, and I'm not that."

Musical style and themes 
Doja Cat's music has been described as hip hop, pop, R&B, and pop rap. When asked about her legacy, Doja Cat revealed that in future she would like to be remembered for her versatility in not only music but also visual art and dance. Her second full-length studio album, Hot Pink, is built with her own beats as well as a series of videos written and conceived by herself. She claimed the era was a firm restart for her career, and the most "refined, chiseled" representation of herself. Her escapist fantasy worldview is reflected in the music by its upbeat production style. The record was inspired by drastic lifestyle changes including an "illuminating" acid trip which made her quit smoking cigarettes and marijuana.

Personal life 
Doja Cat is reported to be "eager to deflect interest in her personal life". She lived in a home in Beverly Hills, California, which she bought in 2021 for $2.2 million and sold in September 2022 for $2.5 million. 

She was in a brief open relationship with American musician Jawny from August 2019 until separating in February 2020. Despite not having formally come out or openly stated her sexual orientation, Doja Cat has hinted at queer themes, stating that she likes "people [she] can have sex with. And you can kinda have sex with anybody". Her 2021 song "Naked" contains a tongue-in-cheek sexual reference that allegedly refers to her bisexuality in that she "like[s] bananas and peaches", while her 2019 single "Bottom Bitch" can also be interpreted as a metaphor for lesbian sex.

In June 2020, Doja Cat donated $100,000 to the Justice for Breonna Taylor Fund, in support of Taylor's family.

Health
On July 24, 2020, Doja Cat revealed she tested positive for COVID-19 in an interview with Capital Xtra, adding, "I'm OK now. It was a four-day symptom freak-out but I'm fine now". On December 12, 2021, she revealed she tested positive for COVID-19 a second time, and cancelled the remainder of her appearances at the iHeartRadio Jingle Ball Tour.

In May 2022, Doja Cat opened up about her nicotine addiction on Twitter, and revealed that she required lancing of an infected tonsil caused by vaping and intended to pursue a tonsillectomy, consequently canceling her summer festival run and her opening act slot for the Weeknd's After Hours til Dawn Stadium Tour.

Public image 
Doja Cat has been noted for being versatile in her music. This includes her ability to sing, rap, and produce, as well as act, perform and dance. Often described as eccentric, she is known for her absurdly humorous personality and posts on social media platforms. Bryan Rolli of Forbes wrote that "Doja Cat's aloof, irreverent, chronically online persona masks a tireless work ethic; she sings better, raps faster and dances harder than many of her peers, all at once." In an article for Okayplayer, Robyn Mowatt noted that "as a singer, rapper, songwriter, and entertainer Doja has led her fans on a rambunctious journey equipped with snappy lyrics, live video streams, outlandish outfits, and memorable viral moments. It's not just the music that gets her fans riled up, it's also her live performances which typically are infused with a touch of eccentricity."

Controversies 
In 2018, Doja Cat sparked controversy on social media when her Twitter history revealed the usage of the word "faggot". In a tweet from 2015, she used the word to describe hip hop artists Tyler, the Creator and Earl Sweatshirt. Doja Cat initially defended her past remarks but later issued a series of apologies for her words and has since deleted her tweets. As a result of the controversy, Doja Cat was declared the Milkshake Duck of 2018 by NME.

In March 2020, Doja Cat received backlash after saying on Instagram live that COVID-19 was "only a flu" and that she was not scared of it. Later that October, Doja Cat was criticized for participating in Kendall Jenner's Halloween and birthday celebrations during the COVID-19 pandemic.

In May 2020, a 2015 song by Doja Cat titled "Dindu Nuffin" resurfaced. "Dindu Nuffin" is an alt-right term used to ridicule African-American victims of police brutality who claim they are innocent. After apologizing, Doja Cat said that although the song was intended to flip the term's meaning, it was a "bad decision." Doja Cat denied that the song was a response to the death of Sandra Bland, calling the allegation "one of the most awful rumors that I've ever encountered." She took to Instagram to address accusations after footage began circulating of her on Tinychat in a chat room saying "nigger." She apologized to those offended and said she should not have been on certain chat room sites, although she maintained that she had never been involved in any racist conversations. Frequent users of the chat room later came forth and revealed that the nature of the chatroom was not specifically racist, also saying that Doja Cat never said anything discriminatory in her conversations.

Doja Cat's 2020 performance of "Say So" at the MTV Europe Music Awards ceremony was criticized when some viewers noted that the guitar solo in the performance was identical to the one in Plini's 2016 song "Handmade Cities". The next month, Plini reported that Doja Cat left him an apologetic message through social media.

In March 2022, Doja Cat threatened to quit music due to the backlash from an incident that occurred during her time in Paraguay. The artist was in Paraguay for the 2022 Asunciónico Festival which was eventually canceled due to severe weather conditions, which included flooding and thunderstorms. After it was canceled, fans reportedly gathered outside the hotel she was residing at in order to get a glimpse of the artist. She did not come outside to meet with these fans and was consequently accused of being rude and apathetic. She did not post any social media photos about Paraguay, leaving fans feeling "empty." She was also accused of being more enthusiastic with fans from other countries such as Brazil compared to her behavior with Paraguayan fans. Because of the backlash the artist released a series of tweets where she claimed she was not sorry and she would quit the music industry, she then changed her Twitter username to "I Quit". The artist did not quit music or Twitter and returned two days later with appreciative tweets towards her fans.

In July 2022, Doja Cat experienced a texting privacy breach scandal with actor Noah Schnapp regarding actor Joseph Quinn.

Discography 

 Amala (2018)
 Hot Pink (2019)
 Planet Her (2021)

Filmography

Television

Awards and nominations 

Doja Cat has received many accolades throughout her career, including one Grammy Award, five Billboard Music Awards, five American Music Awards (AMAs), and three MTV Video Music Awards (VMAs).

Tours

Headlining 
 Amala Tour (2018–2019)

Supporting 
 Theophilus London – Vibes Tour (2015)
 Lizzo – Good as Hell Tour (2017)

See also 
 List of Zulu people
 List of Los Angeles rappers
 List of artists who reached number one in the United States
 List of Billboard Hot 100 number ones of 2020
 List of most-streamed artists on Spotify

References

External links 

 

 
 
 

 
1995 births
Living people
American child singers
21st-century American rappers
21st-century African-American women singers
21st-century women rappers
African-American Jews
African-American women rappers
African-American women singer-songwriters
American contemporary R&B singers
American hip hop record producers
American people of South African descent
American TikTokers
American women hip hop singers
American women pop singers
American women record producers
Former Hindus
Grammy Award winners
Jewish American musicians
Jewish rappers
Jewish women singers
MTV Europe Music Award winners
People from Tarzana, Los Angeles
Pop rappers
Rappers from Los Angeles
RCA Records artists
Record producers from California
Singers from Los Angeles
Singer-songwriters from California
Women hip hop record producers
Zulu people